Upper Shockoe Valley is a neighborhood in Richmond, Virginia that straddles alongside Interstate 95. The name is given based on the Shockoe River Valley created within the boundaries of the neighborhood.

See also 

 Neighborhoods of Richmond, Virginia
 Richmond, Virginia

References

External links 
 Google Maps view of the neighborhood

Neighborhoods in Richmond, Virginia